Airton de Souza, (commonly known simply as Souza), is a coach, goalkeeper and a former player for Comerciario (Criciúma Esporte Clube).

References 

Living people
Brazilian footballers
Criciúma Esporte Clube players
1958 births
Association football goalkeepers